The Hallands Fotbollförbund (Halland Football Association) is one of the 24 district organisations of the Swedish Football Association. It administers lower tier football in the historical province of Halland.

Background 

Hallands Fotbollförbund, commonly referred to as Hallands FF, is the governing body for football in the historical province of Halland which corresponds with modern-day Halland County. The Association currently has 99 member clubs.  Based in Halmstad, the Association's Chairman is Johan Johqvist.

Affiliated Members 

The following clubs are affiliated to the Hallands FF:

Alets IK
Andersbergs IK
Annebergs IF
Arvidstorps IK
BK Astrio
BK Viljan
BK Walldia
Bua IF
Derome BK
DFK Hasko
Falkenbergs FF
FF Serbiska Halmstad
Frillesås FF
Galgbackens IF
Galtabäcks BK
Genevad/Veinge IF
Getinge IF
Glommens IF
GoIF Ginsten
Grimetons IK
Grimmareds IF
Gullbrandstorps AIS
H Å FF
Halmstads BK
Harplinge IK
Hasslövs IS
Haverdal  IF
Hishults AIS
Hyltebruks IF
IF Älvena
IF Böljan
IF Centern
IF Leikin
IF Norvalla
IFK Bänared
IFK Fjärås
IFK Varberg
Inka FK
IS Halmia
IS Örnia
Karl-Gustavs BK
Knäreds IK
Kornhult/Hishult FF
Kornhults IK
Kullavik IF
Kung Karl Bollklubb
Kungsäters IF
Kungsbacka IF
Kurdiska IF Halmstad
Kvibille BK
Laholms FK
Landeryd/Långaryds FF 
Långås IF
Lerkils IF
Lidhults GOIF
Lilla Tjärby IK
Lilla Träslövs FF
Löftadalens IF
Morups IF
Onsala BK
Oskarströms IS
Ränneslövs GIF
Rinia IF
Rolfstorps GOIF
Särö IK
Sennans IF
Serbiska KIF Halmstad
Simlångsdalens IF
Skällinge BK
Skogaby BK
Skottorps IF
Skrea IF
Slöinge GOIF
Snöstorp Nyhem FF
Sperlingsholms IF
Stafsinge IF
Tofta GOIF
Tölö IF
Torup/Rydö FF
Träslövsläge IF
Trönninge BK
Trönninge IF
Tvååkers IF
Ullareds IK
Valinge IF
Vallda FF Kungsbacka
Vapnö IF
Varbergs BoIS FC
Varbergs GIF FK
Väröbacka GOIF
Våxtorps BOIS
Veddige BK
Vessigebro BK
Vinbergs IF
Ysby BK
Åsa IF
Åsklosters IF
Ätrafors BK
Ätrans FF

League Competitions 
Hallands FF run the following League Competitions:

Men's Football
Division 4  -  two sections
Division 5  -  two sections
Division 6  -  three sections

Women's Football
Division 3  -  one section
Division 4  -  two sections 
Division 5  -  three sections

Footnotes

External links 
 Hallands FF Official Website 

Hallands
Football in Halland County